George DesBrisay DeBlois (October 21, 1887 – April 22, 1958) was a wholesale merchant and political figure on Prince Edward Island. He served as 14th Lieutenant Governor of Prince Edward Island from December 1933 to September 1939.

He was born in Charlottetown, Prince Edward Island, the son of Robert Fitzgerald DeBlois and Ethel Helen DesBrisay, and educated at Saint Peter's Collegiate. DeBlois married Marion Ella Newbery in 1915. He was commissioner for the Provincial Tuberculosis Sanatorium.

References 
 The Honourable George DesBrisay DeBlois, Lieutenant Governor Gallery, Government of Prince Edward Island

1887 births
1964 deaths
Lieutenant Governors of Prince Edward Island